Sir Geoffrey Arnold Wallinger  (2 May 1903 – 5 July 1979) was a British diplomat who was envoy to Hungary and ambassador to Thailand, Austria and Brazil. He was a signatory of the treaty that ended the occupation of Austria following World War II.

Career
Wallinger was educated at Sherborne School (where he played cricket for the school) and Clare College, Cambridge. He joined the Diplomatic Service in 1926 and served at Cairo, Vienna, Pretoria and Cape Town, Buenos Aires and Nanking (the capital of the Kuomintang government of China) as well as at the Foreign Office.

Wallinger was Minister (head of mission) to Hungary 1949–51 and Ambassador to Thailand 1951–54. He was appointed Ambassador to Austria in 1954, but served as High Commissioner until Austria was released from Allied occupation; during that time he completed the negotiations of, and signed, the Austrian Independence Treaty of May 1955. He remained in Vienna as Ambassador until 1958. He was then Ambassador to Brazil 1958–63.

Honours
Wallinger was appointed  in 1947, knighted KCMG in the 1953 Coronation Honours, and awarded the additional, senior knighthood of GBE in the 1963 New Year Honours.

References
WALLINGER, Sir Geoffrey (Arnold), Who Was Who, A & C Black, 1920–2015 (online edition, Oxford University Press, 2014)

External links

1903 births
1979 deaths
People educated at Sherborne School
Alumni of Clare College, Cambridge
Ambassadors of the United Kingdom to Hungary
Ambassadors of the United Kingdom to Thailand
Ambassadors of the United Kingdom to Austria
Ambassadors of the United Kingdom to Brazil
Knights Grand Cross of the Order of the British Empire
Knights Commander of the Order of St Michael and St George